Baghishan may refer to:
 Baghshan
 Baghshan-e Gach